Kyi Lwin is a Myanmar football coach and former player who played as a defender.

Playing career
Lwin won the silver medal with the Myanmar national team at the 1993 SEA Games. He played for China League Two side Yunnan Tianyuan in 1996.

Managerial career
In 2015, Lwin worked as head coach of Magway FC of the Myanmar National League and of the Myanmar U23 national team. He led the Myanmar U23 to win the silver medal at the 2015 Southeast Asian Games even with most of the key players given up to the Myanmar U-20 team for the FIFA U-20 World Cup and to the senior national team for the 2018 FIFA World Cup qualifiers.

He has also worked as the assistant coach of the senior national team.

Honours

Player
Myanmar
 Southeast Asian Games football tournament: runner-up 1993

Manager
Myanmar U23
 Southeast Asian Games football tournament: runner-up 2015

References

External links
 

Year of birth missing (living people)
Living people
Burmese footballers
Association football defenders
Myanmar international footballers
Footballers at the 1994 Asian Games
Asian Games competitors for Myanmar
Burmese football managers
Burmese expatriate footballers
Expatriate footballers in China